Black and White in a Grey World is the third album by Leslie Phillips, released in 1985 on Myrrh Records. Phillips picked up her first Grammy Award nomination (as Leslie Phillips) for Best Gospel Performance, Female at the 28th Grammy Awards. The album peaked at number 13 on the Billboard Top Inspirational Albums chart.

Track listing
All songs written by Leslie Phillips, except where noted.

Side one
 "Black And White in a Grey World"  – 4:20
 "Tug of War"  – 3:21
 "When The World Is New"  – 4:31
 "Psalm 55"  – 3:49
 "Your Kindness"  – 4:02
 "Larger Than Life"  – 3:44

Side two
 "The More I Know You"  – 5:02
 "Smoke Screen" (Phillips, Daniel Brown)  – 3:38
 "You're My Lord"  – 4:14
 "Walls of Silence"  – 4:54
 "You're the Same"  – 4:15
 "Love Is Not Lost"  – 3:46

Note: Cassette and LP versions did not include "Larger Than Life" and "Love Is Not Lost". However, these tracks were issued on vinyl in Australia. "Love Is Not Lost" would later be rerecorded for Phillips' 1987 album, The Turning.

Personnel 

 Leslie Phillips – vocals
 Alan Pasqua – keyboards, track arrangements
 John Andrew Schreiner – keyboards, Fairlight CMI, track arrangements
 Rhett Lawrence – Fairlight programming, track arrangements
 Dann Huff – guitars, track arrangements
 Nathan East – bass
 Neil Stubenhaus – bass
 Carlos Vega – drums
 John Robinson – drums
 Paulinho da Costa – percussion
 Dawn Bianchi – backing vocals
 John Flynn – backing vocals
 Kurt Howell – backing vocals
 Dan Posthuma – backing vocals 
 Táta Vega – backing vocals
 Matthew Ward – backing vocals
 Bill Schnee – background voices
 Cheryl Wilks – background voices

Production 

 Brad Burkhart – executive producer
 Dan Posthuma – producer
 Dan Garcia – engineer 
 Dennis McKay – engineer
 Rick Riggeri – engineer 
 Bill Schnee – mixing
 Doug Sax – mastering
 The Mastering Lab (Hollywood, California) – mastering location
 Aaron Rapoport – photography
 Bradley Grose – art direction, design

Charts

Radio singles

References 

Black and White in a Grey World
Black and White in a Grey World
Myrrh Records albums
Word Records albums